Xenolechia pseudovulgella is a moth of the family Gelechiidae. It is found in southern Greece and Turkey.

References

Moths described in 1999
Xenolechia